The Chisholm Trail Heritage Center and Garis Gallery of the American West is a museum and cultural center in Duncan, Oklahoma, which celebrates the historic Chisolm Trail.  Located just north of the Red River on the historic Chisholm Trail in Duncan, Oklahoma, this is not your typical “stop-and-stare” museum. It is an interactive adventure for cowboys and cowgirls of all ages. 

Toss a rope around a Longhorn steer; ride a bucking bronco; create your own brand or sit a spell near the campfire and listen to Jesse Chisholm as he offers advice to a young cowboy on his first cattle drive. In the multi-sensory Experience Theater, smell the wildflowers of a springtime Oklahoma prairie, listen to the thundering hooves of a cattle stampede, and feel the wind and rain on your face as a storm rages. Meet our extremely rude chuckwagon or sit a spell in the Duncan Store.

Among other exhibits, is the bronze monument “On the Chisholm Trail,” by artist Paul Moore. 

History:

In the early 1990s, a group of concerned citizens from Duncan, southwest Oklahoma, and northern Texas came together to form a partnership to increase the quality of life in the region, help educate people of all ages on the courage, struggles and successes of settlement in this hostile area, and provide an information stop on the route of modern-day explorers of the Chisholm Trail.

From the beginning, the facility hosted children and visitors with the highest quality educators and static exhibits to celebrate the men and women who rode the Trail, settled the area, were stationed at nearby Ft. Sill and Ft. Arbuckle, started businesses and raised families or were indigenous peoples forced to drastically alter their lifestyles due to the encroachment of the other travelers and settlers.

Construction began on the Chisholm Trail Heritage Center (CTHC) in 1997 with expansions in 2003, 2005 and 2007. Guests visit the Heritage Center from all over the country and from around the world. 

There are other museums dedicated to the Chisholm Trail in Kingfisher, Oklahoma (the Chisholm Trail Museum), in Waurika, Oklahoma (the Chisholm Trail Historical Museum), in Wellington, Kansas (the Chisholm Trail Museum), in Cleburne, Texas, and in Cuero, Texas.

References

Museums in Stephens County, Oklahoma
Chisholm Trail
History museums in Oklahoma